Yara da Silva Amaral (September 16, 1936 – December 31, 1988) was a Brazilian actress.

Filmography

"Telenovelas" 
 1968 - A Pequena Órfã - Raquel (TV Excelsior)
 1968 - A Última Testemunha - Maria Sofredora (TV Record)
 1968 - O Décimo Mandamento - Luzia (TV Tupi)
 1968 - O Direito dos Filhos - Margareth (TV Excelsior)
 1970 - E Nós, Aonde Vamos? - Leila (TV Tupi)
 1970 - Irmãos Coragem - Tula
 1977 - Espelho Mágico - Suzete Calmon
 1978 - Dancin' Days - Áurea
 1981 - O Amor É Nosso - Maria Helena
 1982 - Sol de Verão - Sofia
 1983 - Guerra dos Sexos - Nieta
 1984 - Viver a Vida - Germana (Rede Manchete)
 1985 - Um Sonho a Mais - Beatriz
 1986 - Anos Dourados - Celeste
 1986 - Cambalacho - Dinorah Melina Sousa e Silva
 1987 - Helena - Dorzinha (Rede Manchete)
 1987 - Mandala - Salma
 1988 - Fera Radical - Joana Flores

Cinema 
 1973 - Tati
 1975 - O Rei da Noite
 1977 - Parada 88, o Limite de Alerta
 1978 - A Dama do Lotação
 1978 - Nos Embalos de Ipanema
 1980 - Mulher Objeto
 1981 - Prova de Fogo
 1985 - Tropclip
 1987 - Leila Diniz

References

External links

1936 births
1988 deaths
20th-century Brazilian actresses
People from Jaboticabal